Abotani or Abu Tani is considered the progenitor of the Tani tribes of the state of Arunachal Pradesh in India, such as the Apatani, Nyishi, Adi, Galos, and Tagin. The Mishing tribe of Assam also belongs to the Abotani group. Abotani tribes are also found inside Tibet/China near Indo-China border. Inside China, Abotani tribes come under an ethnic tribe called the Lhoba, which is a conglomeration of the Mishmi and Abotani tribes. They follow the Donyi-Polo religion and credit Abotani with the technique of rice cultivation.

Abo or Abu means "father" and Tani means "human".

Oral history
The following story is told by priests (miri) among the Adi people:

Other Tani legends reference Abotani: a woman in the Digo Ane region told him how to cultivate rice; Abotani was successful at rice cultivation thanks to his wise wife, Aio Diiliang Diibiu; however, he divorced her to marry another woman. The new wife's pursuit of leisure brought disgrace to his wealth; when Abotani realized this, he left the second wife and continued the cultivation on his own. Once he needed his sister's help to descend from a high tree he had climbed.

Events in Abotani's life and his quest for rice are part of Tani traditions and are celebrated in different periods of the year (following the rice cultivation season). Abutani is a symbol of the struggle of humankind for food and prosperity, and of the need for harmony between man and woman to bring wealth to the family.

See also
Tani (tribes)

References

Donyi-Polo
Year of birth missing
Mising people